Kasr El Harit is a small town located in the heart of the Egyptian desert, near the Nile. It is a site of historical importance; namely, because in 1900, there was excavated a scutum (a type of Roman shield).

References

Populated places in Egypt